Dylan Pereira (born 10 June 1997 in Luxembourg City) is a Portuguese Luxembourger racing driver. He started his career on sim racing (iRacing). A long-time Porsche driver, he is the current champion of the Porsche Supercup.

Racing Record

Career Summary

Complete 24 Hours of Le Mans results

References

External links

 Profile at Driver Database
 Official website

Luxembourgish racing drivers
Luxembourgian people of Portuguese descent
1997 births
Living people
Porsche Supercup drivers
Sportspeople from Luxembourg City
24H Series drivers
FIA World Endurance Championship drivers
ADAC GT Masters drivers
24 Hours of Le Mans drivers

Portuguese racing drivers
Walter Lechner Racing drivers
Porsche Motorsports drivers
Phoenix Racing drivers
Porsche Carrera Cup Germany drivers